A Woman, an Animal, a Diamond is a 1923 German silent film directed by Hanns Kobe and starring Charlotte Ander, Fritz Kortner and Paul Bildt.

The film's sets were designed by the art director Fritz Lück and Walter Reimann.

Cast
 Charlotte Ander as Camilla
 Fritz Kortner as Urmensch
 Paul Bildt as Stadtschreiber Iwan
 Georg John as Zirkusdirektor
 Ernst Rotmund as Bändiger
 Alexander Granach as Archivar Lindhorst
 Viktor Schwannecke as Bürgermeister
 Ernst Behmer
 Hugo Döblin
 Paul Graetz
 Leon Richter
 Wilhelm Völcker
 Yuri Yurovsky

References

Bibliography
 Bock, Hans-Michael & Bergfelder, Tim. The Concise CineGraph. Encyclopedia of German Cinema. Berghahn Books, 2009.

External links

1923 films
Films of the Weimar Republic
German silent feature films
Films directed by Hanns Kobe
German black-and-white films
1920s German films